A non-combatant evacuation operation (NEO) is an operation conducted to evacuate civilians from another country, generally due to a deteriorating security situation.

Australia
2021 - Afghanistan

China
2015 - Yemen: (Houthi takeover in Yemen)

Germany
1997 - Operation Libelle: Albania
2011 - Operation Pegasus (2011): Libya

Greece
1993 – Operation Golden Fleece: Abkhazia, Georgia (War in Abkhazia (1992–1993))
1997 – Operation Kosmas: Albania (Albanian Civil War)
2006 - Operation Kedros: Lebanon (2006 Lebanon War)

India
1990 - 1990 airlift of Indians from Kuwait: Kuwait (Gulf War)
2006 - Operation Sukoon: Lebanon (2006 Lebanon War)
2011 - Operation Safe Homecoming: Libya (First Libyan Civil War)
2015 - Operation Raahat: Yemen
2016 - Operation Sankat Mochan: Juba, South Sudan (Battle of Juba)
2021 - Operation Devi Shakti: Kabul, Afghanistan (2021 Taliban offensive)
2022 - Operation Ganga: Ukraine (2022 Russian invasion of Ukraine)

Ireland (Republic of)
2011 - Libya (First Libyan Civil War)
2021 - 2021 Kabul airlift

Israel
1948-1953 - Operation Goshen: Egypt
1949-1950 - Operation Magic Carpet (Yemen): Yemen
1951-1952 - Operation Ezra and Nehemiah: Iraq
1961 - Operation Mural: Morocco
1961-1964 - Operation Yachin: Morocco
1984-1985 - Operation Moses: Sudan
1985 - Operation Joshua: Sudan
1991 - Operation Solomon: Ethiopia

Pakistan
2015 - Yemen

United Kingdom
2000 - Operation Palliser: Sierra Leone (Sierra Leone Civil War)
2006 - Operation Highbrow: Lebanon (2006 Lebanon War)
2021 - Operation Pitting: Kabul, Afghanistan (2021 Taliban offensive)

United States
According to United States Military Joint Publication 3-68, Noncombatant Evacuation Operations:

"Noncombatant evacuation operations (NEOs) are conducted to assist the Department of State (DOS) in evacuating noncombatants, nonessential military personnel, selected host-nation citizens, and third country nationals whose lives are in danger from locations in a host foreign nation to an appropriate safe haven and/or the United States.

NEOs usually involve swift insertions of a force, temporary occupation of an objective, and a planned withdrawal upon completion of the mission.

During NEOs, the US Ambassador is the senior authority for the evacuation and is ultimately responsible for the successful completion of the NEO and the safety of the evacuees. The Ambassador speaks with the authority of the President and serves as direct representative on site."

This means that at times American citizens may become endangered in locations outside of the United States.  This is usually due to civil unrest or war.  However, it may also be due to a natural disaster.  The U.S. Ambassador has the responsibility, according to law, to request a NEO.  Once he does, the government will determine whether or not the evacuation should be done with civilian resources, such as the Civil Reserve Air Fleet (CRAF), or with military forces.  Even if military forces conduct the evacuation, the Ambassador remains in charge of the evacuation.

The method of evacuation could include sealift, airlift, or even by road.

Notable operations
1975 – Operation Frequent Wind: Fall of Saigon, Vietnam War
1976 – Operation Fluid Drive: Lebanese Civil War
1990 – Operation Sharp Edge: Liberia
1991 – Operation Eastern Exit: Somalia
1991 – Operation Fiery Vigil: Clark Air Base and U.S. Naval Base Subic Bay, Philippines (1991 eruption of Mount Pinatubo)
1992 – Operation Silver Anvil: Sierra Leone
1994 – Operation Tiger Rescue: Yemen
1996 – Operation Assured Response: Liberia
1996 – Operation Quick Response: Central African Republic
1997 – Operation Silver Wake: Albania
1997 – Operation Noble Obelisk: Sierra Leone
1998 – Operation Safe Departure: Asmara, Eritrea (Eritrean–Ethiopian War)
1998 – Operation Shepherd Venture: Bissau, Guinea-Bissau (Guinea-Bissau Civil War)
2002 – Operation Shepherd Sentry: Bangui, Central African Republic (political and military unrest leading up to the Central African Republic Bush War)
2002 – Operation Autumn Return: Yamoussoukro, Côte d'Ivoire (First Ivorian Civil War)
2003 – Operation Shining Express: Monrovia, Liberia (Second Liberian Civil War)
2006 – 2006 Lebanon War
2010 – Operation Tacit Drift: 2010 Kingston Unrest - Jamaica
2011 – Operation Pacific Passage: Tōhoku region, Japan (2011 Tōhoku earthquake and tsunami)
2011 – Operation Odyssey Dawn: various locations within Libya: (Libyan Crisis)
2014 – Libya
2017 - 2017 Dutch St. Maarten NEO after Hurricane Irma
2021 - Operation Allies Refuge: Kabul, Afghanistan (2021 Taliban offensive)

References

External links
US Military Publication for Noncombatant Evacuation Operation

Non-combatant evacuation operations